Eric Johannesen (born 16 July 1988) is a German former representative rower. He is a dual Olympian, an Olympic gold medallist and was a 2011 world champion.

He was in the crew that won the gold medal in the men's eight competition at the 2012 Summer Olympics in London.  At the 2016 Summer Olympics in Rio de Janeiro, he rowed in the German men's eight which won the silver medal.

Personal
Johannesen was born in Oberhausen, West Germany. His club rowing was from the Bergedorf Rowing Club till 2017 and then the Favorite Hammonia Rowing Club. His younger brother Torben Johannesen is also an Olympic and world champion rower.

Johannesen along with the other eight 2016 Olympic silver medal rowers was awarded the Silbernes Lorbeerblatt (Silver Laurel Leaf), Germany's highest sports award, for the achievement. It was Reinelt's second such award having been similarly recognised for his 2012 Olympic gold.

International rowing career

References

External links
 
 
 
 

1988 births
Living people
Rowers at the 2012 Summer Olympics
Olympic rowers of Germany
Olympic gold medalists for Germany
Olympic medalists in rowing
Medalists at the 2012 Summer Olympics
German male rowers
Olympic silver medalists for Germany
Medalists at the 2016 Summer Olympics
Rowers at the 2016 Summer Olympics
World Rowing Championships medalists for Germany
European Rowing Championships medalists
Recipients of the Silver Laurel Leaf
Sportspeople from Oberhausen